The discography of Atlanta, Georgia-based ambient and psychedelic band Deerhunter includes six studio albums, two extended plays, five vinyl singles, three split albums, and four music videos.  The band has also made appearances on a number of compilation albums.  Deerhunter was formed in 2001 by vocalist Bradford Cox and drummer Moses Archuleta.  Members to later join were guitarists Colin Mee and Lockett Pundt, and bassists Justin Bosworth and Josh Fauver.  Bosworth was killed in a skateboarding accident early in the band's career, leading to his replacement by Fauver.  Mee left Deerhunter in 2007 after scheduling conflicts preventing him from performing at a number of shows.

Deerhunter released their first album, Turn It Up Faggot, named for an insult shouted at Cox during live shows, in 2005.  Its successor, Cryptograms, was released in January 2007, followed by Fluorescent Grey EP several months later.  Cox said in an interview with Stylus Magazine that "Cryptograms is a subdued and introverted album", characterizing Turn It Up Faggot as being "about anger and frustration" and calling the group's first record "a total failure."  In 2008, Deerhunter released its third studio album, Microcastle, which included a bonus disc titled Weird Era Cont..  In 2009, the EP Rainwater Cassette Exchange was released.  Microcastle was the first Deerhunter release to appear on American music charts, earning spots on the Billboard 200, Billboards Top Independent Albums, and peaking at #1 on the Top Heatseekers chart.  Rainwater Cassette Exchange also charted on Top Heatseekers, peaking at #28.

Studio albums

Extended plays

Singles

Music videos

Split albums

Compilation appearances

Miscellaneous

References

External links

Discographies of American artists